The men's long jump at the 1962 British Empire and Commonwealth Games as part of the athletics programme was held at the Perry Lakes Stadium on Saturday 24 November 1962.

Medalists

Records
Prior to the competition, the records were as follows:

The following new championship (games) and national records were set during the competition:

Final

References

Men's long jump
1962